Harry Dickason (16 April 1890 – 21 January 1962) was a British gymnast who competed in the 1912 Summer Olympics.

He was part of the British team, which won the bronze medal in the gymnastics men's team, European system event in 1912.

Harry worked at Cadburys for 44 1/2 years, where he worked in the Sheet Metal Department then the Mould Makers department.  Both his brothers (Willie and Albert) and his 4 sisters (Gertrude, Doreen, Elsie and Florence) also all worked for Cadburys. His Aunt (Eliza Shrimpton) was Richard Cadbury's Housekeeper.

External links
profile

Notes

1890 births
1962 deaths
British male artistic gymnasts
Gymnasts at the 1912 Summer Olympics
Olympic gymnasts of Great Britain
Olympic bronze medallists for Great Britain
Olympic medalists in gymnastics
Medalists at the 1912 Summer Olympics
20th-century British people